The Holland Park Circle was an informal group of 19th-century artists based in the Holland Park district of West London. George Frederick Watts, Frederic Leighton, Valentine Prinsep, Luke Fildes, Hamo Thornycroft and William Burges are considered key members of the group.

Partial list of artists houses of the Holland Park Circle
2 and 4 Melbury Road, designed by John Belcher and Hamo Thornycroft for the Thorneycroft family.
8 Melbury Road, designed by Richard Norman Shaw for Marcus Stone
The Tower House, 9 Melbury Road (now 29), designed by William Burges for himself
14 Melbury Road for Colin Hunter by J. J. Stevenson
Woodland House, 11 Melbury Road (now 31), designed by Richard Norman Shaw for Luke Fildes
1 Holland Park Road, designed by Philip Webb for Val Prinsep.
2 Holland Park Road (now 12), designed by George Aitchison for Frederic, Lord Leighton, now the Leighton House Museum

References

Further reading 
 

Arts in London
British artist groups and collectives
19th-century art groups
Holland Park
Victorian culture